Unseld is a surname. Notable people with the surname include:

Anton Unseld (1894–1932), German footballer and manager
Benjamin Carl Unseld (1843–1923), American gospel music teacher, composer, and publisher
Wes Unseld (1946–2020), American basketball player, coach, and executive
Wes Unseld Jr., American basketball coach